Downtown Mount Holly Historic District is a national historic district located at Mount Holly, Gaston County, North Carolina.  https://visitmounthollync.com/ It encompasses 25 contributing buildings and 1 contributing structure in the central business district of Mount Holly. The buildings were built between about 1883 and 1960, and characterized by one- and two-story brick commercial buildings. Notable buildings include the Classical Revival style Mount Holly Bank, Evangelical Lutheran Church of the Good Shepherd (1903), First Presbyterian Church (1927), and Charlie's Drugs and Sundries (1960).

It was listed on the National Register of Historic Places in 2012.

References

Historic districts on the National Register of Historic Places in North Carolina
Neoclassical architecture in North Carolina
Buildings and structures in Gaston County, North Carolina
National Register of Historic Places in Gaston County, North Carolina